The 1910 Southwest Texas State football team was an American football team that represented Southwest Texas State Normal School—now known as Texas State University–as an independent during the 1910 college football season. The team was led by first-year head coach James R. Coxen and finished the season with a record of 0–4. The team's captain was Raborn, who played halfback.

Schedule

References

Southwest Texas State
Texas State Bobcats football seasons
College football winless seasons
Southwest Texas State Bobcats football